A7  is the debut mixtape of French rapper SCH, released on November 13, 2015 by Braabus Music, Def Jam and Universal.

A7 is the name of the motorway linking Lyon to Marseille.

Track list
"John Lennon" (2:09)
"A7" (4:44)
"Solides" (4:07)
"Gedeon" (3:19)
"Rêves de gosse" (3:47)
"Genny & Ciiro" (1:20)
"Gomorra" (3:42)
"Mauvaises idées" (2:21)
"Liquide" (featuring Lacrim) (4:43)
"Pas de manières" (featuring Sadek & Lapso Laps) (3:52)
"Drogue prohibée" (3:22)
"Champs-Élysées" (3:45)
"J'reviens de loin" (4:18)
"Fusil" (4:12)

Charts

Weekly charts

Year-end charts

References

2015 mixtape albums
French-language albums